Joshua Clay (Tempest) is a fictional character, a member of the superhero team Doom Patrol in comic books published by DC Comics. Created by Paul Kupperberg and Joe Staton, he first appears as the hero Tempest in Showcase #94 (August 1977).

Joshua Clay appeared in his first live adaptation on the first season of the Doom Patrol television series for DC Universe played by Alimi Ballard.

Fictional character biography
A member of the second Doom Patrol, Joshua Clay is the first DC Comics hero to use the name Tempest. Along with Captain Comet, he is one of the few DC Comics heroes initially identified as a mutant.

Joshua Clay was born in the Brownsville section of Brooklyn, New York, the youngest of five children. His parents struggled to keep their family together in the middle of what was at that time one of the worst slums in the country.  At sixteen, Joshua joined a street gang called the Stompers, and eventually, as a result, wound up being given a choice between prison and service in the United States military. Joshua chose the army and was trained as a combat medic and shipped off to Vietnam.

Less than a month before the end of his tour, Joshua witnessed the attempted massacre of an entire village of Vietnamese non-combatants by his sergeant. Horrified, Joshua unconsciously triggered his powers, blasting the noncom, apparently killing the man.  The stress of this discovery led Clay to go AWOL and flee the country, eventually returning to the U.S. Clay spent the next ten years living as a fugitive. The sergeant eventually becomes Reactron, a repeated foe of the Doom Patrol.

Arani Caulder tracks down Joshua Clay and enlists him as a member of the new Doom Patrol. Clay stays active within this incarnation of the Doom Patrol for a year before it disbands due to internal dissent. Swearing off superheroics, Clay uses his underworld connections to secure a new identity for himself as Jonathan Carmichael, M.D. Due to years of private study and his previous military training, he easily passes his New York medical board examination. As Carmichael, using funds borrowed from a local loan shark, he purchases a small Park Avenue medical practice and lives a quiet, respectable life treating rich hypochondriacs until Robotman tracks Clay down. Due to Steele's threat to reveal Clay's true identity to the medical board, he reluctantly returns to superheroics. He again retires from active service during the Grant Morrison scripted period to become the team's physician.

Joshua Clay is murdered by a temporarily deranged Niles Caulder in Doom Patrol (vol. 2) #55 (May 1992). This is after Joshua discovers the Chief's plan to ravage the world with a genetic weapon in the hopes of ultimately creating an improved society. Dorothy Spinner, upon finding his body, allowed the demonic Candlemaker out into the real world on the condition it bring Joshua back to life. It does so and then immediately kills him again.

During the "Blackest Night" storyline, Joshua Clay was reanimated as a member of the Black Lantern Corps and attacks Elasti-Girl. His powers seem to have changed as he is seen controlling the weather, creating tornados and lightning.

In 2011, "The New 52" rebooted the DC Universe. Tempest first appears in along with Negative Woman and Celsius being watched by Grid. Then he was mentioned in conversation by Scorch and Karma who are then presumably killed off by Johnny Quick and Atomica. Lex Luthor tells Chief that Tempest and Celsius have faked their deaths to escape from him and from the Doom Patrol.

Note
 Two years after Joshua Clay's apparent death, in Doom Patrol (vol. 2) #55, a man named Martin Ellis, who looks like the Steve Lightle rendition of Joshua Clay, wakes from a seven-year coma with an active metagene. In combat with Captain Atom, Ellis exhibits the same powers as Joshua Clay. Ellis reunites with his wife Yvonne at the end of the story. This was his only appearance.

Powers and abilities

Joshua Clay can generate and radiate powerful blasts from his hands, able to melt steel. Tempest can control his blasts' volume and intensity to the extent that he can ignite the head of a match from twenty feet away.

Properly focused and controlled, his energies allow Tempest to propel himself through the air at 90 miles per hour.

When Clay was revived as a Black Lantern, his powers changed where he can control the weather.

Trained as a combat medic by the U.S. Army, he later becomes a licensed physician.

Other versions

Teen Titans: Earth One
In Teen Titans: Earth One continuity, Clay is a member of S.T.A.R. Labs which in this version are the main antagonistic force behind the creation of the Titans.

In other media
Joshua Clay appears in Doom Patrol, portrayed by Alimi Ballard. This version was a member of a 1950s incarnation of the Doom Patrol before they were defeated by Mr. Nobody. Following this, Clay became a caretaker to his incapacitated teammates.

References

External links
 
 Cosmic Teams: Doom Patrol
 DCU guide Tempest Biography
 DCU Guide: Justice League Quarterly #17
 Fanzing #32: Diversity In The DC Universe: 1961-1979
 Sequential Art review of Doom Patrol #31

African-American superheroes
Characters created by Paul Kupperberg
Comics characters introduced in 1977
DC Comics male superheroes
DC Comics metahumans
DC Comics military personnel
Doom Patrol
Fictional characters with energy-manipulation abilities
Fictional physicians
Fictional United States Army personnel
Fictional Vietnam War veterans